Xolotrema is a genus (or subgenus under Triodopsis) of air-breathing land snails, terrestrial pulmonate gastropod mollusks in the family Polygyridae.

Shell description
Pilsbry (1940) characterized the shell of Xolotrema (which he considered to be a subgenus) thus:

"Triodopses, in which the inner margin of the basal lip has a long bladelike lamella, terminating at a notch where it joins the outer arc of the lip; the embryonic whorls are covered with close retractive radial striae (subobsolete in T. fosteri)."

Species
Species within the genus Xolotrema include:
 Xolotrema notata
 Xolotrema obstricta
 Xolotrema carolinensis
 Xolotrema fosteri

References

Polygyridae